Wardpark is an industrial estate in Cumbernauld, Scotland split by the M80 motorway. The former Burroughs factory, the first factory of Cumbernauld new town, was reoccupied by OKI but was demolished to make way for Westway Retail Park, OKI having been relocated to Westfield.

Warkpark is divided into three areas: Wardpark South, on the Abronhill side of the M80; Wardpark North on the Westerwood side; and Wardpark East which next to it and adjacent to Castlecary village. On the aerial photo the yellow building is part of the Wardpark Studios where the Outlander TV series is made. It is just north of the Westway Retail Park. This film company have plans to expand in 2018.
 
John G Russell Transport Limited bought one of the largest warehouses, at 5 Wardpark, early in 2018. Other businesses in Wardpark North include Teledyne Technologies, Aspen Solutions Ltd Corporate Insignia Limited, Thermaflow Ltd, Coilcraft Europe Limited, and Masonry Solutions Ltd.

Wardpark South accommodates: Markon Limited, Moulded Foams (Scotland) Ltd., Northwest Plant Limited
 
Wardpark East accommodates: Coronet Services Limited, Polyglass (GB) Limited,

Cumbernauld Airport is at the northern edge of Wardpark with views down the Strathkelvin valley. The country road to the north has been blocked to motor vehicles and crosses the Antonine Wall and the main Glasgow-Edinburgh railway line before leading to the Forth and Clyde canal.

References

Areas of Cumbernauld
Business parks of Scotland
Industrial parks in the United Kingdom
Economy of North Lanarkshire